Roseville railway station is located on the North Shore line, serving the Sydney suburb of Roseville. It is served by Sydney Trains T1 North Shore line and T9 Northern line services.

History
Roseville station opened on 1 January 1890 as Rossville when the North Shore line opened from Hornsby to St Leonards. It was renamed Roseville on 1 September 1890.

In November 2021 an upgrade to the station was complete which included two new lifts and new toilet facilities.

Platforms and services

Transport links
Transdev NSW operates two routes via Roseville station:
558: Lindfield to Chatswood station
565: Macquarie Park to Chatswood station

Roseville station is served by one NightRide route:
N90: Hornsby station to Town Hall station

References

External links

Roseville station details Transport for New South Wales

Railway stations in Sydney
Railway stations in Australia opened in 1890
North Shore railway line
Roseville, New South Wales